During World War II, the United States Army Air Forces (USAAF) established numerous airfields in Idaho for training pilots and aircrews of USAAF fighters and bombers.

Most of these airfields were under the command of Second Air Force or the Army Air Forces Training Command (AAFTC) (A predecessor of the current-day U.S. Air Force Air Education and Training Command).  However the other USAAF support commands (Air Technical Service Command (ATSC); Air Transport Command (ATC) or Troop Carrier Command) commanded a significant number of airfields in a support roles.

It is still possible to find remnants of these wartime airfields. Many were converted into municipal airports, some were returned to agriculture and several were retained as U.S. Air Force installations and were front-line bases during the Cold War. Hundreds of the temporary buildings that were used survive today, and are being used for other purposes.

Major Airfields in Idaho
 Gowen Field, Boise
     Assigned to Second Air Force
 40th Air Base Squadron/40th Base Headquarters and Air Base Squadron, June 1941-1 April 1944 (See 212th AAFBU)
 42nd Bombardment Group (Medium), 3 June 1941-18 January 1942
 303rd Bombardment Group (Heavy), 11 February 1942-17 June 1942
 306th Bombardment Group (Heavy), 1 March 1942-6 April 1942
 308th Bombardment Group (Heavy), 15 April 1942-20 June 1942
 Hq and Hq Sq, 15th Bombardment Wing, 23 June 1942-14 November 1942
 29th Bombardment Group (Heavy), 25 June 1942-1 April 1944 (See 212th AAFBU)
 96th Bombardment Group (Heavy), 6 August 1942-14 August 1942
 99th Bombardment Group (Heavy), 28 August 1942-30 September 1942
 100th Bombardment Group (Heavy), 28 August 1942-1 November 1942
 381st Bombardment Group (Heavy), 3 November 1942-1 December 1942
 384th Bombardment Group (Heavy), 1 December 1942-2 January 1943
 388th Bombardment Group (Heavy), 24 December 1942-1 February 1943
 393rd Bombardment Group (Heavy), 3 March 1943-3 April 1943
 445th Bombardment Group (Heavy), 1 April 1943-8 June 1943
 399th Bombardment Group (Heavy), 10 April 1943-27 April 1943
 448th Bombardment Group (Heavy), 1 May 1943-3 July 1943
 450th Bombardment Group (Heavy), 1 May 1943-21 May 1943
 Hq and Hq Sq, 15th Bombardment Operational Training Wing, July 1943-May 1944
 456th Bombardment Group (Heavy), 14 July 1943-30 July 1943
 458th Bombardment Group (Heavy), 28 July 1943-11 September 1943
 461st Bombardment Group (Heavy), 29 July 1943-11 September 1943
 464th Bombardment Group (Heavy), 22 August 1943-2 October 1943
 500th Bombardment Group (Very Heavy), 20 November 1943-12 January 1944
 210th Army Air Force Base Unit (Hq, Combat Crew Training Wing), 1 April 1944-May 1944
 212th Army Air Force Base Unit (Combat Crew Training Station, Heavy), 1 April 1944-15 February 1945
     Assigned to Fourth Air Force:
 425th Army Air Force Base Unit (Combat Crew Training Station, Heavy), 15 February 1945-1 March 1946
 Now: Boise Airport and  Gowen Field Air National Guard Base 

 Mountain Home Army Air Field, Mountain Home
     Assigned to Second Air Force:
 396th Bombardment Group (Heavy), 16 Feb 43-10 Apr 43
 470th Bombardment Group (Heavy), 1 May 43-5 Jan 44
 20th Base Headquarters and Air Base Squadron, 6 July 1943-1 April 1944 (See 213th AAFBU)
 490th Bombardment Group (Heavy), 4 December 1943-10 April 1944
 494th Bombardment Group (Heavy), 15 April 1944-1 June 1944
 213th Army Air Force Base Unit (Combat Crew Training Station, Heavy), 1 April 1944-15 February 1945
     Assigned to Fourth Air Force:
 426th Army Air Force Base Unit (Combat Crew Training Station, Heavy), 15 February 1945-20 October 1945
 Now:   Mountain Home Air Force Base 

 Pocatello AAF, Pocatello
     Assigned to Second Air Force:
 382nd Base Headquarters and Air Base Squadron, 30 October 1942-1 April 1944(See 265th AAFBU)
 96th Bombardment Group (Heavy), 30 October 1942-3 January 1943
 19th Bombardment Group (Heavy), 9 December 1942-1 January 1943
 382nd Bombardment Group (Heavy), 5 April 1943-6 December 1943
 453rd Bombardment Group (Heavy), 29 July 1943-30 September 1943
 464th Bombardment Group (Heavy), 2 October 1943-9 February 1944
 476th Fighter Group (Single Engine), 26 March 1944-1 April 1944 (See 265th AAFBU)
 265th Army Air Force Base Unit (Operational Training Unit, Fighter), 1 April 1944-15 November 1944 
 508th Fighter Group (Single Engine), 25 October 1944-15 November 1944
 Now: Pocatello Regional Airport

References
 Maurer, Maurer (1983). Air Force Combat Units Of World War II. Maxwell AFB, Alabama: Office of Air Force History. .
 Ravenstein, Charles A. (1984). Air Force Combat Wings Lineage and Honors Histories 1947-1977. Maxwell AFB, Alabama: Office of Air Force History. .
 Thole, Lou (1999), Forgotten Fields of America : World War II Bases and Training, Then and Now - Vol. 2.  Pictorial Histories Pub . 
 Military Airfields in World War II - Idaho

 01
World War II
Airfields of the United States Army Air Forces in the United States by state
United States World War II army airfields